Kerry Jenkins (born September 6, 1973) is a former American football offensive lineman. He played in the National Football League (NFL) with the New York Jets from 1997 through 2001 and with the Tampa Bay Buccaneers from 2002 through 2004. Jenkins officially retired from the NFL in 2006.

1973 births
Living people
Sportspeople from Tuscaloosa, Alabama
American football offensive guards
Troy Trojans football players
New York Jets players
Tampa Bay Buccaneers players
Troy University alumni